Tarapada Ray was a Bengali writer of poems, short stories, and essays. He is especially known for his satirical sense of humour. He was born on 17 November 1936 in Tangail, now in Bangladesh. He lived in Kolkata in the Indian state of West Bengal until his death on 25 August 2007.

He had his schooling in Bangladesh where he passed his matriculation from Bindubasini High English School. In 1951, he came to Calcutta to attend college. He studied economics in Central Calcutta College (presently Maulana Azad College). For a time he taught in a school in Habra in North 24 Parganas.

Apart from numerous short stories and essays (mostly satirical), he wrote many poems as well. His first collection of poems, "Tomar Pratima" was published in 1960. He also wrote several short shorties commemorating his childhood days spent in East Bengal (Bangladesh).  Among his most important works are novel like Charabari Porabari and travelogue like Neel Digante Tokhon Magic.  He died on 25 August 2007. He was survived by a son and his wife. He was suffering from kidney failure for the last few months. He was so enthusiastic about writing, that it was reported that he even wrote several pieces from his hospital.

Tarapada had close friendship with Hollywood actor Wallace Shawn and famous author Deborah Eisenberg.

Selected bibliography
Kandogyan
Bidda Buddhi
Bhadralok(gentleman)
Mandhata
Buddhishuddhi
Gyan gomyi
Dodo tatai palakahini
Swanirbachita Tarapada Roy
Chilam bhalobashar neel potakatole shadhin
Charabari Porabari
Balish
Poem Collection
Tomar protima - 1960
Chhiam Bhalobasar Nil Patatae Swadhin - 1967
Kothay Jachchhen Tarapada Babu - 1970
Neel Digante Ekhon Magic - 1974
Pata O Pakhider Alochana - 1975
Bhaobasar Kabita - 1977
Daridrarekha - 1986
Durbhikker Kabita
Jaler Moto Kabita - 1992
Din Ani Din Khai - 1994
Tubeshishur Baba - 1995
Bhalo Achho Garib Manus - 2001
Kobi O Parashini - 2002

Awards
Shiromani award
Katha award (1995)

Bengali writers
Tangail District
1936 births
2007 deaths
Maulana Azad College alumni
University of Calcutta alumni
 Writers from Kolkata